Czech Republic competed at the 2022 Winter Paralympics in Beijing, China which took place between 4–13 March 2022.

Competitors
The following is the list of number of competitors participating at the Games per sport/discipline.

Alpine skiing

Czech Republic competed in alpine skiing.

Para ice hockey

Czech Republic competed in para ice hockey.

Summary

Preliminary round

Quarterfinal

Fifth place game

See also
Czech Republic at the Paralympics
Czech Republic at the 2022 Winter Olympics

References

Nations at the 2022 Winter Paralympics
2022
Winter Paralympics